Wye Mountain is a ridge in Perry and Pulaski counties in the U.S. state of Arkansas. It is located in the northeastern foothills of the Ouachita Mountains near Bigelow between the Fourche LaFave and Big Maumelle river valleys.

References 

Landforms of Perry County, Arkansas
Landforms of Pulaski County, Arkansas
Mountains of Arkansas